Maksim Vorobyov may refer to:

 Maksim Vorobyov (businessman) (born 1976), Russian businessman and investor
 Maksim Vorobyov (painter) (1787–1855), Russian landscape painter